Allsvenskan 2002, part of the 2002 Swedish football season, was the 78th Allsvenskan season played. The first match was played 6 April 2002 and the last match was played 2 November 2002. Djurgårdens IF won the league ahead of runners-up Malmö FF, while IFK Norrköping and Kalmar FF were relegated.

Participating clubs

League table

Results

Relegation play-offs 

IFK Göteborg won 3–1 on aggregate.

Season statistics

Top scorers

Attendances

References 

Print
 
 
 

Online
 
 
 
 

Allsvenskan seasons
Swed
Swed
1